Blackrock Clinic is a private hospital in Blackrock, Dublin. It is associated with both the Royal College of Surgeons in Ireland and University College Dublin.

History
The hospital was founded by surgeons Joseph Sheehan, his brother Jimmy Sheehan, Maurice Neligan and Nuclear Medicine Specialist George Duffy as a private, high-tech hospital offering healthcare to private patients, in 1986. In September 2010, the clinic completed a €100 million extension to the existing hospital facility.

Services
Blackrock Clinic has over 300 consultants registered representing over 40 medical specialties. The hospital has been awarded the Joint Commission International (JCI) accreditation. It has contracts with all the main Irish health insurance companies as well as being available to private self paying patients.

References

Blackrock, Dublin
Hospitals in Dún Laoghaire–Rathdown
Hospital buildings completed in 1986
Hospitals established in 1986
Teaching hospitals in the Republic of Ireland
Private hospitals in the Republic of Ireland
1986 establishments in Ireland